Kimberly Mary DeCesare (born August 11, 1991) is an American soccer player who played for Sky Blue FC in the National Women's Soccer League. Over three seasons with the team, she made 15 appearances before asking to be released on July 19, 2017. She previously played soccer for Duke University as a forward.

References

External links 
 

1991 births
Living people
American women's soccer players
National Women's Soccer League players
NJ/NY Gotham FC players
Boston Breakers players
Women's association football midfielders
Eskilstuna United DFF players
Duke Blue Devils women's soccer players
Boston Breakers draft picks
Damallsvenskan players